Corossol is a quartier of Saint Barthélemy in the Caribbean. It is located in the northwestern part of the island. The quartiers' language is Norman.

References

Populated places in Saint Barthélemy
Quartiers of Saint Barthélemy